Whidbey News-Times is a twice-weekly (Wednesday and Saturday) newspaper published in Oak Harbor, Washington, United States covering general news on Whidbey Island.  It is owned by Sound Publishing Inc., a subsidiary of Black Press. Its previous title was the Whidbey Examiner. The title was changed upon the Black Press' acquisition of the paper, which changed the name to the Whidbey News-Times. Its sister paper is the South Whidbey Record.

References

External links
 Sound Publishing: Whidbey News-Times
 Mondo Times: Whidbey News-Times

Biweekly newspapers published in the United States
Publications established in 1891
Newspapers published in Washington (state)
Black Press
1908 establishments in Washington (state)